Parque de las Mujeres is a park in Olímpica, Puerto Vallarta, in the Mexican state of Jalisco. The park features a memorial to victims of femicide.

References

External links

 

Parks in Jalisco
Puerto Vallarta